VK Jihostroj České Budějovice is a professional men's volleyball club based in České Budějovice, which competes in the Czech Extraliga.  

The club was founded in 1944 as Škoda České Budějovice. In 1995, the activities of all men's volleyball teams in TJ Škoda České Budějovice. Since the 1996-97 season, it has been one of the top Czech volleyball teams. The men's team moved on a fully professional basis and the biggest sponsor became Jihostroj a.s. Velešín.  

Jihostroj České Budějovice is the most successful Czech volleyball team of the modern era. Since 2000, club has won Czech extraliga ten times and the Czech Cup seven times.

Honours
 Czech Championship
Winners (10): 1999–2000, 2001–02, 2006–07, 2007–08, 2008–09, 2010–11, 2011–12, 2013–14, 2016–17, 2018–19

 Czech Cup
Winners (8): 1998–99, 1999–2000, 2001–02, 2002–03, 2010–11, 2018–19, 2019–20, 2021–22

References

External links
 Official website 
 Team profile at Volleybox.net

Czech volleyball clubs
Sport in České Budějovice
Volleyball clubs established in 1944